Melanie Burke is an athlete from New Zealand. She has been a national champion or New Zealand representative in rowing, road running, cycling, duathlon, and Ironman triathlon.

Burke grew up on a farm in near Whanganui, New Zealand.  She  moved to Auckland in 2001. 

In her early sports career Burke  specialised in rowing.  By age 24, she had placed fourth and fifth in the coxless fours at consecutive world championships. She was invited to trial for the 2004 Summer Olympics team, however in the absence of a coxless fours event, she decided to move into athletics and running instead. 

Burke  ran, and won, a number of marathons before Bike New Zealand approached her to trial as a road cyclist. Burke was immediately successful, but, because she didn't want to travel overseas for cycling events, she changed her focus again, to multisports.

In 2011 Burke competed in the ITU Powerman Long Distance Duathlon World Championships in Switzerland and won the event. In 2012 she competed again, finishing seventh. In 2013 she won the New Zealand national women's duathlon title. In 2014 she competed in the World Ironman Triathlon Championships in Kona, Hawai`i.

References

Living people
New Zealand female triathletes
Sportspeople from Whanganui
New Zealand female rowers
Rowers from Whanganui
Year of birth missing (living people)
21st-century New Zealand women